A Moon landing is the arrival of a spacecraft on the surface of the Moon. This includes both crewed and robotic missions. The first human-made object to touch the Moon was the Soviet Union's Luna 2, on 13 September 1959.

The United States' Apollo 11 was the first crewed mission to land on the Moon, on 20 July 1969. There were six crewed U.S. landings between 1969 and 1972, and numerous uncrewed landings, with no soft landings happening between 22 August 1976 and 14 December 2013.

The United States is the only country to have successfully conducted crewed missions to the Moon, with the last departing the lunar surface in December 1972. All soft landings took place on the near side of the Moon until 3 January 2019, when the Chinese Chang'e 4 spacecraft made the first landing on the far side of the Moon.

Uncrewed landings

After the unsuccessful attempt by Luna 1 to land on the Moon in 1959, the Soviet Union performed the first hard Moon landing – "hard" meaning the spacecraft intentionally crashes into the Moon – later that same year with the Luna 2 spacecraft, a feat the U.S. duplicated in 1962 with Ranger 4. Since then, twelve Soviet and U.S. spacecraft used braking rockets (retrorockets) to make soft landings and perform scientific operations on the lunar surface, between 1966 and 1976. In 1966, the USSR accomplished the first soft landings and took the first pictures from the lunar surface during the Luna 9 and Luna 13 missions. The U.S. followed with five uncrewed Surveyor soft landings.

The Soviet Union achieved the first uncrewed lunar soil sample return with the Luna 16 probe on 24 September 1970. This was followed by Luna 20 and Luna 24 in 1972 and 1976, respectively. Following the failure at launch in 1969 of the first Lunokhod, Luna E-8 No.201, the Luna 17 and Luna 21 were successful uncrewed lunar rover missions in 1970 and 1973.

Many missions were failures at launch. In addition, several uncrewed landing missions achieved the Lunar surface but were unsuccessful, including: Luna 15, Luna 18, and Luna 23 all crashed on landing; and the U.S. Surveyor 4 lost all radio contact only moments before its landing.

These have generally been end-of-life lunar orbiters that, because of system degradations, could no longer overcome perturbations from lunar mass concentrations ("mascons") to maintain their orbit. Japan's lunar orbiter Hiten impacted the Moon's surface on 10 April 1993. The European Space Agency performed a controlled crash impact with their orbiter SMART-1 on 3 September 2006.

Indian Space Research Organisation (ISRO) performed a controlled crash impact with its Moon Impact Probe (MIP) on 14 November 2008. The MIP was an ejected probe from the Indian Chandrayaan-1 lunar orbiter and performed remote sensing experiments during its descent to the lunar surface.

The Chinese lunar orbiter Chang'e 1 executed a controlled crash onto the surface of the Moon on 1 March 2009. The rover mission Chang'e 3 soft-landed on 14 December 2013, as did its successor, Chang'e 4, on 3 January 2019. All crewed and uncrewed soft landings had taken place on the near side of the Moon, until 3 January 2019 when the Chinese Chang'e 4 spacecraft made the first landing on the far side of the Moon.

On 22 February 2019, Israeli private space agency SpaceIL launched spacecraft Beresheet on board a Falcon 9 from Cape Canaveral, Florida with the intention of achieving a soft landing. SpaceIL lost contact with the spacecraft and it crashed into the surface on 11 April 2019.

Indian Space Research Organization launched Chandrayaan-2 on 22 July 2019 with landing scheduled on 6 September 2019. However, at an altitude of 2.1 km from the Moon a few minutes before soft landing, the lander lost contact with the control room.

Crewed landings

A total of twelve men have landed on the Moon. This was accomplished with two US pilot-astronauts flying a Lunar Module on each of six NASA missions across a 41-month period starting 20 July 1969, with Neil Armstrong and Buzz Aldrin on Apollo 11, and ending on 14 December 1972 with Gene Cernan and Jack Schmitt on Apollo 17. Cernan was the last man to step off the lunar surface.

All Apollo lunar missions had a third crew member who remained on board the command module. The last three missions included a drivable lunar rover, the Lunar Roving Vehicle, for increased mobility.

Scientific background
To get to the Moon, a spacecraft must first leave Earth's gravity well; currently, the only practical means is a rocket. Unlike airborne vehicles such as balloons and jets, a rocket can continue accelerating in the vacuum outside the atmosphere.

Upon approach of the target moon, a spacecraft will be drawn ever closer to its surface at increasing speeds due to gravity. The first three attempts by the U.S. to perform a successful hard Moon landing with a ruggedized seismometer package in 1962 all failed. The Soviets first achieved the milestone of a hard lunar landing with a ruggedized camera in 1966, followed only months later by the first uncrewed soft lunar landing by the U.S.

The speed of a crash landing on its surface is typically between 70 and 100% of the escape velocity of the target moon, and thus this is the total velocity which must be shed from the target moon's gravitational attraction for a soft landing to occur. The change in velocity (referred to as a delta-v) is usually provided by a landing rocket, which must be carried into space by the original launch vehicle as part of the overall spacecraft. An exception is the soft moon landing on Titan carried out by the Huygens probe in 2005. As the moon with the thickest atmosphere, landings on Titan may be accomplished by using atmospheric entry techniques that are generally lighter in weight than a rocket with equivalent capability.

The Soviets succeeded in making the first crash landing on the Moon in 1959. Crash landings may occur because of malfunctions in a spacecraft, or they can be deliberately arranged for vehicles which do not have an onboard landing rocket. There have been many such Moon crashes, often with their flight path controlled to impact at precise locations on the lunar surface. For example, during the Apollo program the S-IVB third stage of the Saturn V rocket as well as the spent ascent stage of the Lunar Module were deliberately crashed on the Moon several times to provide impacts registering as a moonquake on seismometers that had been left on the lunar surface. Such crashes were instrumental in mapping the internal structure of the Moon.

To return to Earth, the escape velocity of the Moon must be overcome for the spacecraft to escape the gravity well of the Moon. Rockets must be used to leave the Moon and return to space. Upon reaching Earth, atmospheric entry techniques are used to absorb the kinetic energy of a returning spacecraft and reduce its speed for safe landing. These functions greatly complicate a moon landing mission and lead to many additional operational considerations. Any moon departure rocket must first be carried to the Moon's surface by a moon landing rocket, increasing the latter's required size. The Moon departure rocket, larger moon landing rocket and any Earth atmosphere entry equipment such as heat shields and parachutes must in turn be lifted by the original launch vehicle, greatly increasing its size by a significant and almost prohibitive degree.

Political background

The intense efforts devoted in the 1960s to achieving first an uncrewed and then ultimately a human Moon landing become easier to understand in the political context of its historical era. World War II had introduced many new and deadly innovations including blitzkrieg-style surprise attacks used in the invasion of Poland and Finland, and in the attack on Pearl Harbor; the V-2 rocket, a ballistic missile which killed thousands in attacks on London and Antwerp; and the atom bomb, which killed hundreds of thousands in the atomic bombings of Hiroshima and Nagasaki. In the 1950s, tensions mounted between the two ideologically opposed superpowers of the United States and the Soviet Union that had emerged as victors in the conflict, particularly after the development by both countries of the hydrogen bomb.

Willy Ley wrote in 1957 that a rocket to the Moon "could be built later this year if somebody can be found to sign some papers". On 4 October 1957, the Soviet Union launched Sputnik 1 as the first artificial satellite to orbit the Earth and so initiated the Space Race. This unexpected event was a source of pride to the Soviets and shock to the U.S., who could now potentially be surprise attacked by nuclear-tipped Soviet rockets in under 30 minutes. Also, the steady beeping of the radio beacon aboard Sputnik 1 as it passed overhead every 96 minutes was widely viewed on both sides as effective propaganda to Third World countries demonstrating the technological superiority of the Soviet political system compared to that of the U.S. This perception was reinforced by a string of subsequent rapid-fire Soviet space achievements. In 1959, the R-7 rocket was used to launch the first escape from Earth's gravity into a solar orbit, the first crash impact onto the surface of the Moon, and the first photography of the never-before-seen far side of the Moon. These were the Luna 1, Luna 2, and Luna 3 spacecraft.

The U.S. response to these Soviet achievements was to greatly accelerate previously existing military space and missile projects and to create a civilian space agency, NASA. Military efforts were initiated to develop and produce mass quantities of intercontinental ballistic missiles (ICBMs) that would bridge the so-called missile gap and enable a policy of deterrence to nuclear war with the Soviets known as mutual assured destruction or MAD. These newly developed missiles were made available to civilians of NASA for various projects (which would have the added benefit of demonstrating the payload, guidance accuracy and reliabilities of U.S. ICBMs to the Soviets).

While NASA stressed peaceful and scientific uses for these rockets, their use in various lunar exploration efforts also had secondary goal of realistic, goal-oriented testing of the missiles themselves and development of associated infrastructure, just as the Soviets were doing with their R-7.

Early Soviet uncrewed lunar missions (1958–1965)
After the fall of the Soviet Union in 1991, historical records were released to allow the true accounting of Soviet lunar efforts. Unlike the U.S. tradition of assigning a particular mission name in advance of a launch, the Soviets assigned a public "Luna" mission number only if a launch resulted in a spacecraft going beyond Earth orbit. The policy had the effect of hiding Soviet Moon mission failures from public view. If the attempt failed in Earth orbit before departing for the Moon, it was frequently (but not always) given a "Sputnik" or "Cosmos" Earth-orbit mission number to hide its purpose. Launch explosions were not acknowledged at all.

Early U.S. uncrewed lunar missions (1958–1965)

In contrast to Soviet lunar exploration triumphs in 1959, success eluded initial U.S. efforts to reach the Moon with the Pioneer and Ranger programs. Fifteen consecutive U.S. uncrewed lunar missions over a six-year period from 1958 to 1964 all failed their primary photographic missions; however, Rangers 4 and 6 successfully repeated the Soviet lunar impacts as part of their secondary missions.

Failures included three U.S. attempts in 1962 to hard land small seismometer packages released by the main Ranger spacecraft. These surface packages were to use retrorockets to survive landing, unlike the parent vehicle, which was designed to deliberately crash onto the surface.

Pioneer missions

Three different designs of Pioneer lunar probes were flown on three different modified ICBMs. Those flown on the Thor booster modified with an Able upper stage carried an infrared image scanning television system with a resolution of 1 milliradian to study the Moon's surface, an ionization chamber to measure radiation in space, a diaphragm/microphone assembly to detect micrometeorites, a magnetometer, and temperature-variable resistors to monitor spacecraft internal thermal conditions. The first, a mission managed by the United States Air Force, exploded during launch; all subsequent Pioneer lunar flights had NASA as the lead management organization.

NASA then collaborated with the United States Army's Ballistic Missile Agency to fly two extremely small cone-shaped probes on the Juno ICBM, carrying only photocells which would be triggered by the light of the Moon and a lunar radiation environment experiment using a Geiger-Müller tube detector.

The final Pioneer lunar probe design consisted of four "paddlewheel" solar panels extending from a one-meter diameter spherical spin-stabilized spacecraft body equipped to take images of the lunar surface with a television-like system, estimate the Moon's mass and topography of the poles, record the distribution and velocity of micrometeorites, study radiation, measure magnetic fields, detect low frequency electromagnetic waves in space and use a sophisticated integrated propulsion system for maneuvering and orbit insertion as well. None of the four spacecraft built in this series of probes survived launch on its Atlas ICBM outfitted with an Able upper stage.

Following the unsuccessful Atlas-Able Pioneer probes, NASA's Jet Propulsion Laboratory embarked upon an uncrewed spacecraft development program whose modular design could be used to support both lunar and interplanetary exploration missions. The interplanetary versions were known as Mariners; lunar versions were Rangers. JPL envisioned three versions of the Ranger lunar probes: Block I prototypes, which would carry various radiation detectors in test flights to a very high Earth orbit that came nowhere near the Moon; Block II, which would try to accomplish the first Moon landing by hard landing a seismometer package; and Block III, which would crash onto the lunar surface without any braking rockets while taking very high resolution wide-area photographs of the Moon during their descent.

Ranger missions

The Ranger 1 and 2 Block I missions were virtually identical. Spacecraft experiments included a Lyman-alpha telescope, a rubidium-vapor magnetometer, electrostatic analyzers, medium-energy-range particle detectors, two triple coincidence telescopes, a cosmic-ray integrating ionization chamber, cosmic dust detectors, and scintillation counters.

From that vantage point, scientists could make direct measurements of the magnetosphere over a period of many months while engineers perfected new methods to routinely track and communicate with spacecraft over such large distances. Such practice was deemed vital to be assured of capturing high-bandwidth television transmissions from the Moon during a one-shot fifteen-minute time window in subsequent Block II and Block III lunar descents. Both Block I missions suffered failures of the new Agena upper stage and never left low Earth parking orbit after launch; both burned up upon reentry after only a few days.

The first attempts to perform a Moon landing took place in 1962 during the Rangers 3, 4 and 5 missions flown by the United States. This lander (code-named Tonto) was designed to provide impact cushioning using an exterior blanket of crushable balsa wood and an interior filled with incompressible liquid freon. A 42 kg (56 pounds)  metal payload sphere floated and was free to rotate in a liquid freon reservoir contained in the landing sphere.

This payload sphere contained six silver-cadmium batteries to power a fifty-milliwatt radio transmitter, a temperature sensitive voltage controlled oscillator to measure lunar surface temperatures, and a seismometer designed with sensitivity high enough to detect the impact of a  meteorite on the opposite side of the Moon. Weight was distributed in the payload sphere so it would rotate in its liquid blanket to place the seismometer into an upright and operational position no matter what the final resting orientation of the external landing sphere. After landing, plugs were to be opened allowing the freon to evaporate and the payload sphere to settle into upright contact with the landing sphere. The batteries were sized to allow up to three months of operation for the payload sphere. Various mission constraints limited the landing site to Oceanus Procellarum on the lunar equator, which the lander ideally would reach 66 hours after launch.

No cameras were carried by the Ranger landers, and no pictures were to be captured from the lunar surface during the mission. Instead, the  Ranger Block II mother ship carried a 200-scan-line television camera to capture images during the free-fall descent to the lunar surface. The camera was designed to transmit a picture every 10 seconds.

Other instruments gathering data before the mother ship crashed onto the Moon were a gamma ray spectrometer to measure overall lunar chemical composition and a radar altimeter. The radar altimeter was to give a signal ejecting the landing capsule and its solid-fueled braking rocket overboard from the Block II mother ship.

On Ranger 3, failure of the Atlas guidance system and a software error aboard the Agena upper stage combined to put the spacecraft on a course that would miss the Moon. Attempts to salvage lunar photography during a flyby of the Moon were thwarted by in-flight failure of the onboard flight computer. This was probably because of prior heat sterilization of the spacecraft by keeping it above the boiling point of water for 24 hours on the ground, to protect the Moon from being contaminated by Earth organisms. Heat sterilization was also blamed for subsequent in-flight failures of the spacecraft computer on Ranger 4 and the power subsystem on Ranger 5. Only Ranger 4 reached the Moon in an uncontrolled crash impact on the far side of the Moon.

Heat sterilization was discontinued for the final four Block III Ranger probes. These replaced the Block II landing capsule and its retrorocket with a heavier, more capable television system to support landing site selection for upcoming Apollo crewed Moon landing missions. Six cameras were designed to take thousands of high-altitude photographs in the final twenty-minute period before crashing on the lunar surface. Camera resolution was 1,132 scan lines, far higher than the 525 lines found in a typical U.S. 1964 home television. While Ranger 6 suffered a failure of this camera system and returned no photographs despite an otherwise successful flight, the subsequent Ranger 7 mission to Mare Cognitum was a complete success.

Breaking the six-year string of failures in U.S. attempts to photograph the Moon at close range, the Ranger 7 mission was viewed as a national turning point and instrumental in allowing the key 1965 NASA budget appropriation to pass through the United States Congress intact without a reduction in funds for the Apollo crewed Moon landing program. Subsequent successes with Ranger 8 and Ranger 9 further buoyed U.S. hopes.

Soviet uncrewed soft landings (1966–1976)

The Luna 9 spacecraft, launched by the Soviet Union, performed the first successful soft Moon landing on 3 February 1966. Luna 13 duplicated this feat with a similar Moon landing on 24 December 1966. Both returned panoramic photographs that were the first views from the lunar surface.

Luna 16 was the first robotic probe to land on the Moon and safely return a sample of lunar soil back to Earth. It represented the first lunar sample return mission by the Soviet Union, and was the third lunar sample return mission overall, following the Apollo 11 and Apollo 12 missions. This mission was later successfully repeated by Luna 20 (1972) and Luna 24 (1976).

In 1970 and 1973 two Lunokhod ("Moonwalker") robotic lunar rovers were delivered to the Moon, where they successfully operated for 10 and 4 months respectively, covering 10.5 km (Lunokhod 1) and 37 km (Lunokhod 2). These rover missions were in operation concurrently with the Zond and Luna series of Moon flyby, orbiter and landing missions.

U.S. uncrewed soft landings (1966–1968)

The U.S. robotic Surveyor program was part of an effort to locate a safe site on the Moon for a human landing and test under lunar conditions the radar and landing systems required to make a true controlled touchdown. Five of Surveyor's seven missions made successful uncrewed Moon landings. Surveyor 3 was visited two years after its Moon landing by the crew of Apollo 12. They removed parts of it for examination back on Earth to determine the effects of long-term exposure to the lunar environment.

Transition from direct ascent landings to lunar orbit operations
Within four months of each other in early 1966 the Soviet Union and the United States had accomplished successful Moon landings with uncrewed spacecraft. To the general public both countries had demonstrated roughly equal technical capabilities by returning photographic images from the surface of the Moon. These pictures provided a key affirmative answer to the crucial question of whether or not lunar soil would support upcoming crewed landers with their much greater weight.

However, the Luna 9 hard landing of a ruggedized sphere using airbags at a  ballistic impact speed had much more in common with the failed 1962 Ranger landing attempts and their planned  impacts than with the Surveyor 1 soft landing on three footpads using its radar-controlled, adjustable-thrust retrorocket. While Luna 9 and Surveyor 1 were both major national accomplishments, only Surveyor 1 had reached its landing site employing key technologies that would be needed for a crewed flight. Thus as of mid-1966, the United States had begun to pull ahead of the Soviet Union in the so-called Space Race to land a man on the Moon.

Advances in other areas were necessary before crewed spacecraft could follow uncrewed ones to the surface of the Moon. Of particular importance was developing the expertise to perform flight operations in lunar orbit. Ranger, Surveyor and initial Luna Moon landing attempts all flew directly to the surface without a lunar orbit. Such direct ascents use a minimum amount of fuel for uncrewed spacecraft on a one-way trip.

In contrast, crewed vehicles need additional fuel after a lunar landing to enable a return trip back to Earth for the crew. Leaving this massive amount of required Earth-return fuel in lunar orbit until it is used later in the mission is far more efficient than taking such fuel down to the lunar surface in a Moon landing and then hauling it all back into space yet again, working against lunar gravity both ways. Such considerations lead logically to a lunar orbit rendezvous mission profile for a crewed Moon landing.

Accordingly, beginning in mid-1966 both the U.S. and U.S.S.R. naturally progressed into missions featuring lunar orbit as a prerequisite to a crewed Moon landing. The primary goals of these initial uncrewed orbiters were extensive photographic mapping of the entire lunar surface for the selection of crewed landing sites and, for the Soviets, the checkout of radio communications gear that would be used in future soft landings.

An unexpected major discovery from initial lunar orbiters were vast volumes of dense materials beneath the surface of the Moon's maria. Such mass concentrations ("mascons") can send a crewed mission dangerously off course in the final minutes of a Moon landing when aiming for a relatively small landing zone that is smooth and safe. Mascons were also found over a longer period of time to greatly disturb the orbits of low-altitude satellites around the Moon, making their orbits unstable and forcing an inevitable crash on the lunar surface in the relatively short period of months to a few years.

Controlling the location of impact for spent lunar orbiters can have scientific value. For example, in 1999 the NASA Lunar Prospector orbiter was deliberately targeted to impact a permanently shadowed area of Shoemaker Crater near the lunar south pole. It was hoped that energy from the impact would vaporize suspected shadowed ice deposits in the crater and liberate a water vapor plume detectable from Earth. No such plume was observed. However, a small vial of ashes from the body of pioneer lunar scientist Eugene Shoemaker was delivered by the Lunar Prospector to the crater named in his honor – currently the only human remains on the Moon.

Soviet lunar orbit satellites (1966–1974)

Luna 10 became the first spacecraft to orbit the Moon on 3 April 1966.

U.S. lunar orbit satellites (1966–1967)

Soviet circumlunar loop flights (1967–1970)

It is possible to aim a spacecraft from Earth so it will loop around the Moon and return to Earth without entering lunar orbit, following the so-called free return trajectory. Such circumlunar loop missions are simpler than lunar orbit missions because rockets for lunar orbit braking and Earth return are not required. However, a crewed circumlunar loop trip poses significant challenges beyond those found in a crewed low-Earth-orbit mission, offering valuable lessons in preparation for a crewed Moon landing. Foremost among these are mastering the demands of re-entering the Earth's atmosphere upon returning from the Moon.

The g-loading on astronauts during the resulting deceleration can be at the limits of human endurance even during a nominal reentry. Slight variations in the vehicle flight path and reentry angle during a return from the Moon can easily result in fatal levels of deceleration force.

Achieving a crewed circumlunar loop flight prior to a crewed lunar landing became a primary goal of the Soviets with their Zond spacecraft program. The first three Zonds were robotic planetary probes; after that, the Zond name was transferred to a completely separate human spaceflight program. The initial focus of these later Zonds was extensive testing of required high-speed reentry techniques. This focus was not shared by the U.S., who chose instead to bypass the stepping stone of a crewed circumlunar loop mission and never developed a separate spacecraft for this purpose.

Initial crewed spaceflights in the early 1960s placed a single person in low Earth orbit during the Soviet Vostok and U.S. Mercury programs. A two-flight extension of the Vostok program known as Voskhod effectively used Vostok capsules with their ejection seats removed to achieve Soviet space firsts of multiple person crews in 1964 and spacewalks in early 1965. These capabilities were later demonstrated by the U.S. in ten Gemini low Earth orbit missions throughout 1965 and 1966, using a totally new second-generation spacecraft design that had little in common with the earlier Mercury. These Gemini missions went on to prove techniques for orbital rendezvous and docking crucial to a crewed lunar landing mission profile.

After the end of the Gemini program, the Soviet Union began flying their second-generation Zond crewed spacecraft in 1967 with the ultimate goal of looping a cosmonaut around the Moon and returning him or her immediately to Earth. The Zond spacecraft was launched with the simpler and already operational Proton launch rocket, unlike the parallel Soviet human Moon landing effort also underway at the time based on third-generation Soyuz spacecraft requiring development of the advanced N-1 booster. The Soviets thus believed they could achieve a crewed Zond circumlunar flight years before a U.S. human lunar landing and so score a propaganda victory. However, significant development problems delayed the Zond program and the success of the U.S. Apollo lunar landing program led to the eventual termination of the Zond effort.

Like Zond, Apollo flights were generally launched on a free return trajectory that would return them to Earth via a circumlunar loop if a service module malfunction failed to place them in lunar orbit. This option was implemented after an explosion aboard the Apollo 13 mission in 1970, which is the only crewed circumlunar loop mission flown to date.

Zond 5 was the first spacecraft to carry life from Earth to the vicinity of the Moon and return, initiating the final lap of the Space Race with its payload of tortoises, insects, plants, and bacteria. Despite the failure suffered in its final moments, the Zond 6 mission was reported by Soviet media as being a success as well. Although hailed worldwide as remarkable achievements, both these Zond missions flew off-nominal reentry trajectories resulting in deceleration forces that would have been fatal to humans.

As a result, the Soviets secretly planned to continue uncrewed Zond tests until their reliability to support human flight had been demonstrated. However, due to NASA's continuing problems with the lunar module, and because of CIA reports of a potential Soviet crewed circumlunar flight in late 1968, NASA fatefully changed the flight plan of Apollo 8 from an Earth-orbit lunar module test to a lunar orbit mission scheduled for late December 1968.

In early December 1968 the launch window to the Moon opened for the Soviet launch site in Baikonur, giving the USSR their final chance to beat the US to the Moon. Cosmonauts went on alert and asked to fly the Zond spacecraft then in final countdown at Baikonur on the first human trip to the Moon. Ultimately, however, the Soviet Politburo decided the risk of crew death was unacceptable given the combined poor performance to that point of Zond/Proton and so scrubbed the launch of a crewed Soviet lunar mission. Their decision proved to be a wise one, since this unnumbered Zond mission was destroyed in another uncrewed test when it was finally launched several weeks later.

By this time flights of the third generation U.S. Apollo spacecraft had begun. Far more capable than the Zond, the Apollo spacecraft had the necessary rocket power to slip into and out of lunar orbit and to make course adjustments required for a safe reentry during the return to Earth. The Apollo 8 mission carried out the first human trip to the Moon on 24 December 1968, certifying the Saturn V booster for crewed use and flying not a circumlunar loop but instead a full ten orbits around the Moon before returning safely to Earth. Apollo 10 then performed a full dress rehearsal of a crewed Moon landing in May 1969. This mission orbited within  of the lunar surface, performing necessary low-altitude mapping of trajectory-altering mascons using a factory prototype lunar module too heavy to land. With the failure of the robotic Soviet sample return Moon landing attempt Luna 15 in July 1969, the stage was set for Apollo 11.

Human Moon landings (1969–1972)

US strategy

Plans for human Moon exploration began during the Eisenhower administration. In a series of mid-1950s articles in Collier's magazine, Wernher von Braun had popularized the idea of a crewed expedition to establish a lunar base. A human Moon landing posed several daunting technical challenges to the US and USSR. Besides guidance and weight management, atmospheric re-entry without ablative overheating was a major hurdle. After the Soviets launched Sputnik, von Braun promoted a plan for the US Army to establish a military lunar outpost by 1965.

After the early Soviet successes, especially Yuri Gagarin's flight, US President John F. Kennedy looked for a project that would capture the public imagination. He asked Vice President Lyndon Johnson to make recommendations on a scientific endeavor that would prove US world leadership. The proposals included non-space options such as massive irrigation projects to benefit the Third World. The Soviets, at the time, had more powerful rockets than the US, which gave them an advantage in some kinds of space mission.

Advances in US nuclear weapon technology had led to smaller, lighter warheads; the Soviets' were much heavier, and the powerful R-7 rocket was developed to carry them. More modest missions such as flying around the Moon, or a space lab in lunar orbit (both were proposed by Kennedy to von Braun), offered too much advantage to the Soviets; landing, however, would capture the world's imagination.

Johnson had championed the US human spaceflight program ever since Sputnik, sponsoring legislation to create NASA while he was still a senator. When Kennedy asked him in 1961 to research the best achievement to counter the Soviets' lead, Johnson responded that the US had an even chance of beating them to a crewed lunar landing, but not for anything less. Kennedy seized on Apollo as the ideal focus for efforts in space. He ensured continuing funding, shielding space spending from the 1963 tax cut, but diverting money from other NASA scientific projects. These diversions dismayed NASA's leader, James E. Webb, who perceived the need for NASA's support from the scientific community.

The Moon landing required development of the large Saturn V launch vehicle, which achieved a perfect record: zero catastrophic failures or launch vehicle-caused mission failures in thirteen launches.

For the program to succeed, its proponents would have to defeat criticism from politicians both on the left (more money for social programs) and on the right (more money for the military). By emphasizing the scientific payoff and playing on fears of Soviet space dominance, Kennedy and Johnson managed to swing public opinion: by 1965, 58 percent of Americans favored Apollo, up from 33 percent two years earlier. After Johnson became President in 1963, his continuing defense of the program allowed it to succeed in 1969, as Kennedy had planned.

Soviet strategy

Soviet leader Nikita Khrushchev said in October 1963 the USSR was "not at present planning flight by cosmonauts to the Moon," while insisting that the Soviets had not dropped out of the race. Only after another year did the USSR fully commit itself to a Moon-landing attempt, which ultimately failed.

At the same time, Kennedy had suggested various joint programs, including a possible Moon landing by Soviet and U.S. astronauts and the development of better weather-monitoring satellites, eventually resulting in the Apollo-Soyuz mission. Khrushchev, sensing an attempt by Kennedy to steal Russian space technology, rejected the idea at first: if the USSR went to the Moon, it would go alone. Though Khrushchev was eventually warming up to the idea, but the realization of a joint Moon landing was choked by Kennedy's assassination.

Sergey Korolev, the Soviet space program's chief designer, had started promoting his Soyuz craft and the N1 launcher rocket that would have the capability of carrying out a human Moon landing. Khrushchev directed Korolev's design bureau to arrange further space firsts by modifying the existing Vostok technology, while a second team started building a completely new launcher and craft, the Proton booster and the Zond, for a human cislunar flight in 1966. In 1964 the new Soviet leadership gave Korolev the backing for a Moon landing effort and brought all crewed projects under his direction.

With Korolev's death and the failure of the first Soyuz flight in 1967, coordination of the Soviet Moon landing program quickly unraveled. The Soviets built a landing craft and selected cosmonauts for a mission that would have placed Alexei Leonov on the Moon's surface, but with the successive launch failures of the N1 booster in 1969, plans for a crewed landing suffered first delay and then cancellation.

A program of automated return vehicles was begun, in the hope of being the first to return lunar rocks. This had several failures. It eventually succeeded with Luna 16 in 1970. But this had little impact, because the Apollo 11 and Apollo 12 lunar landings and rock returns had already taken place by then.

Apollo missions

In total, twenty-four U.S. astronauts have traveled to the Moon. Three have made the trip twice, and twelve have walked on its surface. Apollo 8 was a lunar-orbit-only mission, Apollo 10 included undocking and Descent Orbit Insertion (DOI), followed by LM staging to CSM redocking, while Apollo 13, originally scheduled as a landing, ended up as a lunar fly-by, by means of free return trajectory; thus, none of these missions made landings. Apollo 7 and Apollo 9 were Earth-orbit-only missions. Apart from the inherent dangers of crewed Moon expeditions as seen with Apollo 13, one reason for their cessation according to astronaut Alan Bean is the cost it imposes in government subsidies.

Human Moon landings

Other aspects of the successful Apollo landings

President Richard Nixon had speechwriter William Safire prepare a condolence speech for delivery in case Armstrong and Aldrin became marooned on the Moon's surface and could not be rescued.

In 1951, science fiction writer Arthur C. Clarke forecast that a man would reach the Moon by 1978.

On 16 August 2006, the Associated Press reported that NASA is missing the original Slow-scan television tapes (which were made before the scan conversion for conventional TV) of the Apollo 11 Moon walk. Some news outlets have mistakenly reported the SSTV tapes found in Western Australia, but those tapes were only recordings of data from the Apollo 11 Early Apollo Surface Experiments Package. The tapes were found in 2008 and sold at auction in 2019 for the 50th anniversary of the landing.

Scientists believe the six American flags planted by astronauts have been bleached white because of more than 40 years of exposure to solar radiation. Using LROC images, five of the six American flags are still standing and casting shadows at all of the sites, except Apollo 11. Astronaut Buzz Aldrin reported that the flag was blown over by the exhaust from the ascent engine during liftoff of Apollo 11.

Late 20th century–Early 21st century uncrewed crash landings

Hiten (Japan)
Launched on 24 January 1990, 11:46 UTC. At the end of its mission, the Japanese lunar orbiter Hiten was commanded to crash into the lunar surface and did so on 10 April 1993 at 18:03:25.7 UT (11 April 03:03:25.7 JST).

Lunar Prospector (US)
Lunar Prospector was launched on 7 January 1998. The mission ended on 31 July 1999, when the orbiter was deliberately crashed into a crater near the lunar south pole after the presence of water ice was successfully detected.

SMART-1 (ESA)
Launched 27 September 2003, 23:14 UTC from the Guiana Space Centre in Kourou, French Guiana. At the end of its mission, the ESA lunar orbiter SMART-1 performed a controlled crash into the Moon, at about 2 km/s. The time of the crash was 3 September 2006, at 5:42 UTC.

Chandrayaan-1 (India)
The impactor, the Moon Impact Probe, an instrument on Chandrayaan-1 mission, impacted near Shackleton crater at the south pole of the lunar surface at 14 November 2008, 20:31 IST. Chandrayaan-1 was launched on 22 October 2008, 00:52 UTC.

Chang'e 1 (China)
The Chinese lunar orbiter Chang'e 1, executed a controlled crash onto the surface of the Moon on 1 March 2009, 20:44 GMT, after a 16-month mission. Chang'e 1 was launched on 24 October 2007, 10:05 UTC.

SELENE (Japan)
SELENE or Kaguya after successfully orbiting the Moon for a year and eight months, the main orbiter was instructed to impact on the lunar surface near the crater Gill at 18:25 UTC on 10 June 2009. SELENE or Kaguya was launched on 14 September 2007.

LCROSS (US)
The LCROSS data collecting shepherding spacecraft was launched together with the Lunar Reconnaissance Orbiter (LRO) on 18 June 2009 on board an Atlas V rocket with a Centaur upper stage. On 9 October 2009, at 11:31 UTC, the Centaur upper stage impacted the lunar surface, releasing the kinetic energy equivalent of detonating approximately 2 tons of TNT (8.86 GJ). Six minutes later at 11:37 UTC, the LCROSS shepherding spacecraft also impacted the surface.

GRAIL (US)
The GRAIL mission consisted of two small spacecraft: GRAIL A (Ebb), and GRAIL B (Flow). They were launched on 10 September 2011 on board a Delta II rocket. GRAIL A separated from the rocket about nine minutes after launch, and GRAIL B followed about eight minutes later. The first probe entered orbit on 31 December 2011 and the second followed on 1 January 2012. The two spacecraft impacted the Lunar surface on 17 December 2012.

LADEE (US)
LADEE was launched on 7 September 2013. The mission ended on 18 April 2014, when the spacecraft's controllers intentionally crashed LADEE into the far side of the Moon, which, later, was determined to be near the eastern rim of Sundman V crater.

Chandrayaan 2 (India)
ISRO, the Indian National Space agency, launched Chandrayaan 2 on 22 July 2019. It had three major modules: orbiter, lander and rover. Each of these modules had scientific instruments from scientific research institutes in India and the US. On 7 September 2019 contact was lost with the Vikram lander at an altitude of  after a rough braking phase. Vikram was later confirmed to have crashed and been destroyed.

Manfred Memorial Moon Mission (Luxemburg)
The Manfred Memorial Moon Mission was launched on the 23 October 2014. It conducted a lunar flyby and operated for 19 days which was four times longer than expected. The Manfred Memorial Moon Mission remained attached to the upper stage of its launch vehicle (CZ-3C/E). The spacecraft along with its upper stage impacted the Moon on 4 March 2022.

21st century uncrewed soft landings and attempts

Chang'e 3 (China)
On 14 December 2013 at 13:12 UTC Chang'e 3 soft-landed a rover on the Moon. This was China's first soft landing on another celestial body and world's first lunar soft landing since Luna 24 on 22 August 1976. The mission was launched on 1 December 2013. After successful landing, the lander release the Yutu rover, which moved 114 meters before being immobilized due to system malfunction. But the rover was still operational until July 2016.

Chang'e 4 (China)

On 3 January 2019 at 2:26 UTC Chang'e 4 became the first spacecraft to land on the far side of the Moon. Chang'e 4 was originally designed as the backup of Chang'e 3. It was later adjusted as a mission to the far side of the Moon after the success of Chang'e 3. After making a successful landing within Von Kármán crater, the Chang'e 4 lander deployed the 140kg Yutu-2 rover and began human's very first close exploration of the far side of the Moon. Because the Moon blocks the communications between far side and Earth, a relay satellite, Queqiao, was launched to the Earth–Moon L2 Lagrangian point a few months prior to the landing to enable communications.

Yutu-2, the second lunar rover from China, was equipped with panoramic camera, lunar penetrating radar, visible and near-infrared Imaging spectrometer and advanced small analyzer for neutrals. As of July 2022, it has survived more than 1000 days on the lunar surface and is still driving with cumulative travel distance of over 1200 meters.

Beresheet (Israel)
On 22 February 2019 at 01:45 UTC, SpaceX launched the Beresheet lunar lander, developed by Israel's SpaceIL organization. Launched from Cape Canaveral, Florida on a Falcon 9 booster, with the lander being one of three payloads on the rocket. Beresheet arrived near the Moon using a slow but fuel-efficient trajectory. Taking six weeks and several increasingly large orbits around the Earth, it first achieved a large elliptical orbit around Earth with an apogee near . At that point, with a short deceleration burn, it was caught by the Moon's gravity in a highly elliptical lunar orbit, an orbit which was circularized and reduced in diameter over a week's time, before attempting a landing on the Moon's surface on 11 April 2019. The mission was the first Israeli, and the first privately funded, lunar landing attempt. SpaceIL was originally conceived in 2011 as a venture to pursue the Google Lunar X Prize. On 11 April 2019 Beresheet crashed on the surface of the Moon, as a result of a main engine failure in the final descent. The Beresheet lunar lander's target landing destination was within Mare Serenitatis, a vast volcanic basin on the Moon's northern near side. Despite the failure, the mission represents the closest a private entity has come to a soft lunar landing.

Chang'e 5 (China)

On 6 December 2020 at 21:42 UTC Chang'e 5 landed and collected the first lunar soil samples in over 40 years, and then returned the samples to Earth. The 8.2t stack consisting of lander, ascender, orbiter and returner was launched to lunar orbit by a Long March 5 rocket on November 24. The lander-ascender combination was separated with the orbiter and returner before landing near Mons Rümker in Oceanus Procellarum. The ascender was later launched back to lunar orbit, carrying samples collected by the lander, and completed the first-ever robotic rendezvous and docking in lunar orbit. The sample container was then transferred to the returner, which successfully landed on Inner Mongolia on 16 December 2020, completing China's first extraterrestrial sample return mission.

Landings on moons of other Solar System bodies
Progress in space exploration has recently broadened the phrase moon landing to include other moons in the Solar System. The Huygens probe of the Cassini–Huygens mission to Saturn performed a successful moon landing on Titan in 2005. Similarly, the Soviet probe Phobos 2 came within  of performing a landing on Mars' moon Phobos in 1989 before radio contact with that lander was suddenly lost. A similar Russian sample return mission called Fobos-Grunt ("grunt" means "soil" in Russian) launched in November 2011, but stalled in low Earth orbit. There is widespread interest in performing a future landing on Jupiter's moon Europa to drill down and explore the possible liquid water ocean beneath its icy surface.

Proposed future missions

After the failure of the Vikram lander of Chandrayaan-2, the Indian Space Research Organisation (ISRO) plans to re-attempt a soft landing with a third lunar exploration mission, Chandrayaan-3. It is scheduled to launch in the third quarter of 2022, but has yet to have launched.

The Lunar Polar Exploration Mission is a robotic space mission concept by ISRO and Japan's space agency JAXA that would send a lunar rover and lander to explore south pole region of the Moon in 2024. JAXA is likely to provide launch service using the future H3 rocket, along with responsibility for the rover. ISRO would be responsible for the lander.

Russia's Luna 25 lander is expected to launch in May 2022.

On 11 December 2017, US President Trump signed Space Policy Directive 1, which directed NASA to return to the Moon with a crewed mission, for "long-term exploration and use" and missions to other planets. On 26 March 2019, Vice President Mike Pence formally announced that the mission will include the first female lunar astronaut. The Artemis program has the goal of returning to the Moon with new launch systems.

Historical empirical evidence

Many conspiracists hold that the Apollo Moon landings were a hoax; however, empirical evidence is readily available to show that human Moon landings did occur. Anyone on Earth with an appropriate laser and telescope system can bounce laser beams off three retroreflector arrays left on the Moon by Apollo 11, 14 and 15, verifying deployment of the Lunar Laser Ranging Experiment at historically documented Apollo Moon landing sites and so proving equipment constructed on Earth was successfully transported to the surface of the Moon. In addition, in August 2009 NASA's Lunar Reconnaissance Orbiter began to send back high resolution photos of the Apollo landing sites. These photos show the large descent stages of the six Apollo Lunar Modules which were left behind, the tracks of the three Lunar Roving Vehicles, and the paths left by the twelve astronauts as they walked in the lunar dust. In 2016, then-U.S. president Barack Obama acknowledged that the Moon landing was not a hoax and publicly thanked the members of the television show Mythbusters for publicly proving as such in season 6 episode 2.

See also
 List of Apollo astronauts
 Lunar Escape Systems
 Robert Goddard
 Soyuz 7K-L1
 First on the Moon (disambiguation)

References

Further reading
 James Gleick, "Moon Fever" [review of Oliver Morton, The Moon: A History of the Future; Apollo's Muse: The Moon in the Age of Photography, an exhibition at the Metropolitan Museum of Art, New York City, 3 July – 22 September 2019; Douglas Brinkley, American Moonshot: John F. Kennedy and the Great Space Race; Brandon R. Brown, The Apollo Chronicles: Engineering America's First Moon Missions; Roger D. Launius, Reaching for the Moon: A Short History of the Space Race; Apollo 11, a documentary film directed by Todd Douglas Miller; and Michael Collins, Carrying the Fire: An Astronaut's Journeys (50th Anniversary Edition)]

External links
 NASA's page on Moon landings, missions, etc. (includes information on other space agencies' missions.)
 
 Project Apollo Archive Flickr Gallery: an independently organized collection of high-res photos for the Moon Landing and the Apollo Missions.
 Apollo in Real Time: an independently organized collection of different Apollo missions media, creating a comprehensive and interactive documentation of Apollo missions.

Landing
History of television
 
1959 introductions
Articles containing video clips